Bahria Town Karachi is a privately owned gated suburb just off the M-9 Motorway northeast of Karachi, Pakistan. Construction started in 2014 and will continue.

The community includes the Grand Jamia Mosque, which is the world's third largest mosque, and the Rafi Cricket Stadium, the country's largest, designed by GMW Architects. Bahria Town has the Danzoo which is the largest zoo in Karachi. It has Bahria Adventura which is the largest theme park in Karachi. It has multiple schools, colleges, universities, hospitals, parks, monuments, cinemas and shopping malls. The community will be energy independent with a coal-fired and an LNG-powered electricity generation plant, in partnership with K-Electric. It is also home to a 36-hole United States Golf Association standard golf course.

The community consists of over 60 precincts and is planned to house around one million people. The town will be connected to I. I. Chundrigar Road by a Karachi Metrobus route in the future. In 2019,  Bahria Town Karachi demanded unplanned 35% development charges, which were later inferred for an unknown period. It sparked protests and criticism throughout in Karachi and overseas. Refunds of illegal plotting were issued on priority basis in 2021. Bahria Town was one of the few areas of Karachi not flooded during the 2022 floods even though it received 1050mm rainfall during monsoon season.

Sub-divisions 

Bahria Town Karachi is divided into more than 60 precincts.

Infrastructure 
A number of traditional villages were destroyed to make way for Bahria Town Karachi, often without the requisite legal approval. The development has significantly changed the topography of the area.

Saudi German Hospital Group constructed a 300-bed hospital on a 12-acre site at a cost of $300 million. The Hospital is named Begum Akhtar Rukhsana Memorial Trust Hospital.

On October 5, 2016, K-Electric and Bahria announced plans to set up a plant for construction of a 600MW energy plant exclusively for Bahria Town Karachi.

On September 1, 2016, China Railway Construction Corporation Limited and Bahria Town Group signed agreement for construction on Blue Line of Karachi Metrobus which will connect the town with downtown Karachi.

Controversies

2015 
Pakistan Rangers claimed in a meeting that Bahria Town has been allotted 44,000 acres from Sindh Government, while the amount of land in records is less than 44,000 acres.

2016 
On 1 August 2016, Supreme Court, the top court of Pakistan ordered Bahria Town Karachi and Malir Development Authority (MDA) to halt the construction work at 5,786 acres of land with an immediate effect. In an interim order, the apex court has ruled the land was illegally allotted to Bahria Town by the development authority.

The court also directed National Accountability Bureau (NAB) to complete its investigations and submit a report within two months. It also restrained the Sindh Government from allotting any further land to Bahria Town.

Bahria Town officials rejected the claim and report. One of the officials said that the land has been purchased from local.

2018 
The Supreme Court decided to investigate the Bahria Town Karachi development in May 2018, citing massive irregularities in the way land was acquired. The apex court barred Bahria Town from selling or allotting land in the Bahria Town Karachi project after declaring that the allotment of land to the company by the Sindh Government and a massive land swap with the Malir Development Authority (MDA) was done illegally.

2019 
After 10 months of legal wrangling, the Supreme Court agreed to Bahria Town Karachi's final settlement of Rs460 billion (approximately US$3.1bn) on 21 March 2019. Under the terms of the settlement, Bahria Town Karachi will have to pay the entire amount over seven years. In its ruling, the top court ordered Bahria Town Karachi to pay Rs25 billion by August 2019. From September 2019 onward, it will have to pay monthly installments of Rs2.25bn for the next three years. If the company fails to deposit two installments, Bahria Town Karachi will be considered a defaulter. The first tranche was successfully received on 30 August 2019.

Under the terms of the settlement, only 16,896 acres of the total 24,571 acres has been validated by the Supreme Court

2021 

In April, clashes broke out between Bahria Town Karachi and indigenous Sindhi Villagers when Bahria Town Karachi began expanding its development into nearby villages. In response, many parts of Sindh observed a shutter down strike. Later on June 6, 2021, nationalist parties and indigenous people announce a sit-in in front of Bahria town's iconic gate, later protest went violent and Bahria's iconic gate set on fire by protesters. According to some people of Sindh, the society extending itself illegally with support of Sindh Government and thus some people of Sindh reject this extension.

Following the protests a number of activists and civil society members were beaten or threatened by the Police and Bahria Town Security. Police arrested thousands of people on terrorism related charges including people not present at the July 6 protest.

Gallery

See also
 DHA City

References

Bahria Town